Jasmine Nevins (born 7 October 2003) is an Australian cricketer who currently plays for Victoria in the Women's National Cricket League (WNCL). She plays primarily as a right-arm medium bowler.

Domestic career
Nevins plays grade cricket for Plenty Valley Cricket Club.

In December 2022, Nevins played for Victoria in the Cricket Australia Under-19 National Female Championships, scoring one half-century and taking four wickets. In January 2023, Nevins was added to a senior Victoria squad for the first time. She made her debut for the side on 17 January 2022, against Queensland, scoring 11 runs and bowling three overs. She went on to play five matches overall for the side that season, scoring 71 runs and taking one wicket.

References

External links

2003 births
Living people
Place of birth missing (living people)
Australian women cricketers
Victoria women cricketers